The Alamo Bowl is an NCAA Division I Football Bowl Subdivision college football bowl game played annually since 1993 in the Alamodome in San Antonio, Texas. Since 2010 it matches the second choice team from the Pac-12 Conference and the second choice team from the Big 12 Conference. Traditionally, the Alamo Bowl has been played in December, although it was played in January following the 2009, 2014, and 2015 seasons.

Since 2007, the game has been sponsored by Valero Energy Corporation and officially known as the Valero Alamo Bowl. Previous sponsors include MasterCard (2002–2005), Sylvania (1999–2001), and Builders Square (1993–1998).

History
The game was previously known as the Builders Square Alamo Bowl (1993–1998), the Sylvania Alamo Bowl (1999–2001), and the MasterCard Alamo Bowl (2002–2005).  The logo of the event has evolved to reflect the changes in sponsorship. On May 24, 2007 the Alamo Bowl announced a partnership with San Antonio-based Valero Energy Corporation, and thus the bowl's full name was changed. The partnership with Valero is in place until 2025.

The game originally gave an automatic invite to a team from the now-defunct Southwest Conference (SWC).  However, in 1993, only two of the eight SWC teams finished with the necessary 6 wins against Division I-A teams to become bowl-eligible, and those two teams were already committed to other bowls, so the Iowa Hawkeyes were invited instead. The SWC was able to provide teams for the next two seasons (Baylor Bears in 1994 and Texas A&M Aggies in 1995) before the conference disbanded.

During the 1996 Alamo Bowl, the Iowa Hawkeyes wore plain black helmets (removing their tigerhawk logo and gold stripe) in honor of linebacker Mark Mitchell's mother, who died in a car accident while traveling to San Antonio for the game.

The 2002 Alamo Bowl played between the Colorado Buffaloes and Wisconsin Badgers was the first Alamo Bowl to go into overtime, with the unranked Badgers defeating the No. 14 ranked Buffaloes after kicking a field goal to win 31–28, completing a perfect non-conference schedule at 6-0 (the Badgers finished with a 2-6 record in the Big Ten). The 2008 Alamo Bowl between the Missouri Tigers and Northwestern Wildcats also went into overtime, with the Tigers defeating the Wildcats 30–23.

The 2005 Alamo Bowl ended with one of the most controversial plays in bowl game history. During the multi-lateral play, almost the entire Nebraska Cornhuskers team and coaching staff as well as half of the Michigan Wolverines sideline came onto the field, and the Cornhuskers gave their coach a Gatorade shower before the play was blown dead. It drew parallels to 1982's "The Play", 2000's "Music City Miracle", and 2002's "Bluegrass Miracle". Nebraska would win the game 32−28 after Michigan was not able to reach the endzone.

The 2007 Alamo Bowl between the Penn State Nittany Lions and the Texas A&M Aggies was attended by 66,166, an Alamodome facility-record crowd for a sporting event, breaking the previous record set by the Iowa Hawkeyes and Texas Longhorns in the 2006 Alamo Bowl. The Nittany Lions won the game 24–17.

The Alamo Bowl has sold out seven of its 16 games (1995, 1999, 2001, 2004, 2006, 2007, and 2011).

On August 28, 2009, the Alamo Bowl organizers announced they had reached an agreement with the then Pac-10 Conference to replace the Big Ten Conference in the Alamo Bowl. Under the terms of the agreement, the now Pac-12 Conference's (Pac-12) second-choice team earns a bid to the Alamo Bowl. The agreement took effect beginning with the 2010 college football season. The Pac-12's second-choice team was previously contracted to play in the Holiday Bowl against the third choice from the Big 12. The Big 12's third choice also moved to the Alamo Bowl, and the Holiday Bowl now gets third choice of team from the Pac-12 and the fourth choice from the Big Ten.

In the 2011 Alamo Bowl, the Baylor Bears and Washington Huskies combined to score 123 points, breaking the record for the most points scored in a bowl game in college football history.  Baylor won the game, 67–56. The 2011 game was also the first Alamo Bowl to feature a season's Heisman Trophy winner, Baylor's Robert Griffin III.

Game results
All rankings are taken from the AP Poll prior to the game being played.

Source:

MVPs

Two MVPs are selected for each game; one offensive player and one defensive player.

Source:

Fred Jacoby Sportsmanship Award
The bowl's sportsmanship award is named after Fred Jacoby, who served as SWC commissioner from 1982 to 1993.

Source:

Most appearances
Updated through the December 2022 edition (30 games, 60 total appearances).

Teams with multiple appearances

Teams with a single appearance
Won (6): California, Missouri, Ohio State, Oklahoma, UCLA, Wisconsin

Lost (5): Arizona, Iowa State, Oregon State, Stanford, Utah

With Oklahoma's appearance in the 2021 game, Kansas and West Virginia are the only current or former Big 12 members that have not appeared in the bowl, while Arizona State and USC are the only Pac-12 members that have not appeared. Colorado has appeared as both a member of the Big 12 and Pac-12.

Appearances by conference
Updated through the December 2022 edition (30 games, 60 total appearances).

 Games marked with an asterisk (*) were played in January of the following calendar year.
 Pac-12 record includes appearances when the conference was known as the Pac-10 (before 2011).
 The Southwest Conference (SWC) dissolved after the 1995 season.

Game records

Source:

Media coverage

The bowl has been televised on ESPN since its inception. It has produced eight of the top 20 most-watched bowl games in ESPN history. In 2006, the Alamo Bowl featured the Texas Longhorns and the Iowa Hawkeyes in a game that earned a 6.0 rating, making it the most-watched college football game in ESPN history as more than 8.83 million viewers saw the telecast.

References

External links

 

 
College football bowls
Annual sporting events in the United States
Recurring sporting events established in 1993